Arfon by-election may refer to one of two parliamentary by-elections held for the British House of Commons in the Arfon division of Caernarvonshire, North Wales:

1911 Arfon by-election
1915 Arfon by-election